Glenn F. Webb is a mathematician based in Vanderbilt University. His research interests include mathematical biology and the use of differential equations to model population dynamics and tumor growth.

Webb received his Ph.D. from Emory University in 1968.

In 2012, Webb became a fellow of the American Mathematical Society.

References

Fellows of the American Mathematical Society
Living people
Vanderbilt University faculty
Emory University alumni
20th-century American mathematicians
Year of birth missing (living people)
21st-century American mathematicians